Efa Iwara, also known as Efa, is a Nigerian actor and rapper.

Early life and education 
Iwara was born on 20 August 1990 in Ibadan, Oyo State to his Professor of Linguistics father and Librarian mother. He hails from Ugep in Cross River State.

He attended Staff School, Ibadan for his primary education, and the International School, Barth Road, Ibadan, for his secondary education. He graduated from the University of Ibadan, with a bachelor's degree in Geography.

Career 
Iwara started out his career in the entertainment industry as a musician in 2006 in a group called X-Factor with DJ Clem, Bolaji, Jide and Boye. Following the dissolution of the group, he released his first single and 5 track EP called Waka EP in 2011. His last official single was titled “Fall in Love” featuring Plantashun Boiz in 2014

He made his acting debut in a 2011 episode of Tinsel as a debate moderator. He was however still focused on music at this point. His next appearance was in the first season of MTV Shuga Naija in 2013. He was absent from the acting space until 2016 when he appeared on Life 101 for Ebonylife TV. Since then, he appeared in TV series including Ajoche, an Africa Magic original, Rumor Has It and The Men's Club. He has also featured in movies like Isoken, Seven and Rattlesnake: The Ahanna Story. He earned his first Africa Magic Viewers’ Choice Award (AMVCA) nomination for his performance in Seven.

Discography

Albums 

 Without a Pulse - 2020

EPs 

 Waka EP - 2011

Singles 

 "Fall in Love" 
 "Letter to the President Elect"
 "Sunmobi" 
 "Over you" 
 "Open and Close" 
 "Obandi" 
 "Enigma"
 "E2DFA (E to the F-A)"

Filmography

Television

Films

Awards and nominations

References

External links 

Nigerian male television actors
Nigerian male musicians
Nigerian male rappers
1990 births
Living people
Musicians from Ibadan
International School, Ibadan alumni
Male actors from Ibadan
Nigerian male film actors
21st-century Nigerian male actors
University of Ibadan alumni
Actors from Oyo State
Nigerian rappers